Ayden Faal is an English rugby league centre who most recently played for Hunslet in RFL League 1. He has previously played for Leeds, Dewsbury, Batley and Doncaster.

References

External links
(archived by web.archive.org) Ayden Faal Batley profile

1986 births
Living people
Batley Bulldogs players
Dewsbury Rams players
Doncaster R.L.F.C. players
English rugby league players
Hunslet R.L.F.C. players
Leeds Rhinos players
Place of birth missing (living people)
Rugby league centres